Türker Özenbaş (born 1936) is a Turkish former sports shooter. He competed in the 50 metre pistol event at the 1968 Summer Olympics.

References

1936 births
Living people
Turkish male sport shooters
Olympic shooters of Turkey
Shooters at the 1968 Summer Olympics
Sportspeople from Istanbul
20th-century Turkish people